Chloe is an unincorporated community in Calhoun County, West Virginia, United States.  It lies along West Virginia Route 16 and the West Fork Little Kanawha River, to the south of the towns of Grantsville (the county seat) and  Arnoldsburg.   Its elevation is 794 feet (242 m).  It has a post office with the ZIP code 25235.

References

Unincorporated communities in Calhoun County, West Virginia
Unincorporated communities in West Virginia